The basal angiosperms are the flowering plants which diverged from the lineage leading to most flowering plants. In particular, the most basal angiosperms were called the ANITA grade, which is made up of Amborella (a single species of shrub from New Caledonia), Nymphaeales (water lilies, together with some other aquatic plants) and Austrobaileyales (woody aromatic plants including star anise).

ANITA stands for Amborella, Nymphaeales, I lliciales, Trimeniaceae, and Austrobaileya. Some authors have shortened this to ANA-grade for the three orders, Amborellales, Nymphaeales, and Austrobaileyales, since the order Iliciales was reduced to the family Illiciaceae and placed, along with the family Trimeniaceae, within the Austrobaileyales.

The basal angiosperms are only a few hundred species, compared with hundreds of thousands of species of eudicots, monocots, and magnoliids. They diverged from the ancestral angiosperm lineage before the five groups comprising the mesangiosperms diverged from each other.

Phylogeny

The exact relationships between Amborella, Nymphaeales and Austrobaileyales are not yet clear. Although most studies show that Amborella and Nymphaeales are more basal than Austrobaileyales, and all three are more basal than the mesangiosperms, there is significant molecular evidence in favor of two different trees, one in which Amborella is sister to the rest of the angiosperms, and one in which a clade of Amborella and Nymphaeales is in this position. A 2014 paper says that it presents "the most convincing evidence to date that Amborella plus Nymphaeales together represent the earliest diverging lineage of extant angiosperms". A number of other studies identify Amborella the most basal of all angiosperms.

Older terms

Paleodicots (sometimes spelled "palaeodicots") is an informal name used by botanists (Spichiger & Savolainen 1997, Leitch et al. 1998) to refer to angiosperms which are not monocots or eudicots.

The paleodicots correspond to Magnoliidae sensu Cronquist 1981 (minus Ranunculales and Papaverales) and to Magnoliidae sensu Takhtajan 1980 (Spichiger & Savolainen 1997). Some of the paleodicots share apparently plesiomorphic characters with monocots, e.g., scattered vascular bundles, trimerous flowers, and non-tricolpate pollen.

The "paleodicots" are not a monophyletic group and the term has not been widely adopted.  The APG II system does not recognize a group called "paleodicots" but assigns these early-diverging dicots to several orders and unplaced families: Amborellaceae, Nymphaeaceae (including Cabombaceae), Austrobaileyales, Ceratophyllales (not included among the "paleodicots" by Leitch et al. 1998), Chloranthaceae, and the magnoliid clade (orders Canellales, Piperales, Laurales, and Magnoliales). Subsequent research has added Hydatellaceae to the paleodicots.

The term paleoherb is another older term for flowering plants which are neither eudicots nor monocots.

References

External links
tolweb.org

Angiosperms